Lisa Mamié (born 27 October 1998) is a Swiss swimmer. She competed in the women's 100 metre breaststroke at the 2019 World Aquatics Championships. In 2014, she represented Switzerland at the 2014 Summer Youth Olympics held in Nanjing, China.

References

External links
 

1998 births
Living people
Place of birth missing (living people)
Swimmers at the 2014 Summer Youth Olympics
Swiss female breaststroke swimmers
European Aquatics Championships medalists in swimming
Swimmers at the 2020 Summer Olympics
Olympic swimmers of Switzerland
20th-century Swiss women
21st-century Swiss women